William Dryburgh (22 May 1876 – 5 April 1951) was a Scottish professional footballer who played as an outside right in the Scottish League for Cowdenbeath and in the Football League for The Wednesday.

Career statistics

Honours
Cowdenbeath

 Central League: 1896–97

Tottenham Hotspur

 London League Premier Division: 1902–03

Individual

Cowdenbeath Hall of Fame

References

1876 births
Scottish footballers
Association football outside forwards
People from Cowdenbeath
Cowdenbeath F.C. players
Sheffield Wednesday F.C. players
Millwall F.C. players
Scottish Football League players
Southern Football League players
Tottenham Hotspur F.C. players
Lochgelly United F.C. players
English Football League players
1951 deaths